Periorbital hyperpigmentation, also known as hereditary dark circles, is characterized by darker skin around the eyes caused by the presence of additional melanin. It is an extremely common hereditary human characteristic and is frequently found on individuals with dark skin. Periorbital hyperpigmentation is most prevalent within the 16–25 age group.

See also
Eye shadow
Kohl (cosmetics)
Freckles

References

External links 

Disturbances of human pigmentation
Periorbital conditions